Lyn Frazier (born October 15, 1952, in Madison, Wisconsin) is an experimental linguist, focusing on psycholinguistic research of adult sentence comprehension.

Education and academic career 
Frazier received her PhD in 1978 from the University of Connecticut under the supervision of Janet Dean Fodor, on the subject of parsing strategies in syntax. She is currently a Professor in the Department of Linguistics at the University of Massachusetts, Amherst. She was named the first Distinguished Graduate Mentor at University of Massachusetts and received an award from the University of Massachusetts system for Outstanding Accomplishments in Research and Creative Activity.

She is co-editor of the book series Studies in Theoretical Psycholinguistics, published by Springer.

Research and impact 
Frazier's work has examined how listeners approach the task of processing the incoming language stream. She has proposed and refined syntactic parsing models, including a two-tier parsing system, the garden path model, and the Active Filler Hypothesis. Her recent work has focused on how listeners parse ellipsis.

Key publications 
 (2010) Clifton, C., and Frazier, L. "Imperfect ellipsis:  Antecedents beyond syntax?"  Syntax 13(4), 279-297.
 (2002) Clifton, C., K. Carlson and L. Frazier. "Informative prosodic boundaries." Language and Speech 45(2), 87-114.
 (1989) Frazier, L. and Clifton, C., Jr. "Successive cyclicity in the grammar and the parser." Language and Cognitive Processes, 4(2), 93-126.
 (1978) Frazier, L. and Fodor, J.D. "The sausage machine: A new two-stage parsing model." Cognition 6, 291-325.

References

External links 
 Faculty Webpage at University of Massachusetts

Living people
Linguists from the United States
University of Massachusetts faculty
Psycholinguists
Women linguists
University of Connecticut alumni
Place of birth missing (living people)
1952 births
Fellows of the Linguistic Society of America